"Chevy Van" is a 1973 song, written and sung by Sammy Johns with instrumental backing provided by Los Angeles-based session musicians from the Wrecking Crew. It was a hit single in the United States and Canada in 1975, reaching #5 on the Billboard Hot 100 chart, and becoming a million seller. It was played primarily on Top 40 stations in the 1970s; later re-recordings were done in a country vein.

Released by GRC Records in 1973, the song details how an unnamed male driver picks up an unnamed female, who then proceeds to eventually seduce him into a one-night stand in the back of his Chevrolet Van. At the end he drops her off "in a town that was so small, you could throw a rock from end to end. A dirt road main street, she walked off in bare feet", and laments "It's a shame I won't be passing through again". The song struck a chord with listeners in the sexually liberated 1970s when Johns released it. The popularity of the song is also reflective of the vansploitation films of the period. The original 1973 version was featured in the 1977 film The Van.

In more recent years, country artists Eric Church, Waylon Jennings, and Sammy Kershaw and rock artists Joe Pernice and Fu Manchu have each released covers of the song. Unlike Sammy Johns's original chorus that opens "Cause like a princess she was laying there...", the aforementioned artists sing "Cause like a picture she was laying there..."

Chart history

Weekly charts

Year-end charts

References

External links
 

1973 songs
1975 singles
Sammy Johns songs
Songs written by Sammy Johns
Songs about casual sex